LegendQuest is a 1991 role-playing game published by Board Enterprises.

Contents
LegendQuest is a fantasy role-playing game which uses a point-based system for character creation.

Reviews
Dragon #195
Shadis #15 (Sept., 1994)

References

Fantasy role-playing games